There are at least 13 named lakes and reservoirs in Nevada County, Arkansas.

Lakes
	Grassy Lake, el.  
	Suckles Lake, el.

Reservoirs
	Arkansas Noname 68 Reservoir, el.  
	Barham Lake Number 1, el.  
	Barham Lake Number Two, el.  
	Bee Bee Lake, el.  
	Dupriest Lake, el.  
	Hale Lake, el.  
	Heathlake Reservoir, el.  
	Lake Bradshaw, el.  
	Marlers Lake, el.  
	Rosston Lake, el.  
	Wilson Lake, el.

See also

 List of lakes in Arkansas

Notes

Bodies of water of Nevada County, Arkansas
Nevada